Emil Tischler (born 13 March 1998) is a professional footballer who plays as a midfielder for FK Pardubice in the Czech First League.

International career
Born in Austria, Tischler has represented both Austria and the Czech Republic at youth international level.

Career statistics

Club

References

1998 births
Living people
Austrian footballers
Austria youth international footballers
Czech footballers
Czech Republic youth international footballers
Association football midfielders
Wiener Sport-Club players
FK Austria Wien players
1. FC Slovácko players
FK Pardubice players
Czech National Football League players
Czech First League players
People from Stockerau
Czech people of Austrian descent
Czech Republic under-21 international footballers
Footballers from Lower Austria